Mizuwari (Japanese: 水割り, "cut with water") is a popular way of drinking spirits in Japan. Typically, about two parts of cold water are mixed with one part of the spirit and some ice. The practice comes from Japanese shochu drinking traditions but is also a very popular way of drinking whisky.

A closely related way is to substitute cold water with hot water, in what is known as Oyuwari (お湯割り, "cut with hot water").

References
Nonjatta on mizuwaris

Cocktails with whisky